Fashrah is a settlement in Ras Al Khaimah, United Arab Emirates (UAE).

Populated places in the Emirate of Ras Al Khaimah